Aspinilimosina is a genus of flies belonging to the family Lesser Dung flies.

Species
A. postocellaris Papp, 2004

References

Sphaeroceridae
Diptera of Asia
Brachycera genera